Charoti is a village in the Palghar district of Maharashtra, India. It is located in the Dahanu taluka.

Demographics 
At the 2011 census of India, Charoti had 920 households. The effective literacy rate (i.e. the literacy rate of population excluding children aged 6 and below) was 58.1%.

References 

Villages in Dahanu taluka